A Piece of the Action is a soundtrack album by American rhythm and blues and gospel singer Mavis Staples, from the 1977 film of the same name. It was released on October 10, 1977, by Curtom Records.

Critical reception
In the October 22, 1977 issue, Billboard reviewed the album: "Staples soulfully interprets the musical score, written and produced by Curtis Mayfield, of the flick starring Sidney Poitier, Bill Cosby and James Earl Jones. Staples and Mayfield collaborated previously on "Let's Do It Again", although then supported by her singing sisters. Mayfield's funky rhythms and evocative lyrics are among the composer's better recent efforts. While Staples' throaty vocals remain passionate, Mayfield's backup session men supply the funk. Best cuts: "Chocolate City", "A Piece of the Action", "'Til Blossoms Bloom" and "Koochie, Koochie, Koochie".

Track listing

Personnel
Adapted from the album liner notes.
 Roger Anfinsen - engineer
 Gil Askey - strings and horn arrangements
 Fred Breitberg - engineer
 Sol Bobrov - string and horn contractor
 Mattie Butler - background vocals
 Tony D'Orio - cover portrait
 Marc Hauser - cover portrait
 Denese Heard - background vocals
 Henry Hicks Jr. - background vocals
 Ricki Linton - background vocals
 Curtis Mayfield - producer, rhythm arrangements
 Rich Tufo - keyboards, strings and horn arrangements
 Jim Schubert - art direction and design
 Alfonso Surrett - background vocals
 Keni Burke - bass
 Joseph "Lucky" Scott - bass
 Donelle Hagan - drums
 Quinton Joseph - drums
 Henry Gibson - congas, percussion
 Floyd Morris - keyboards, synthesizers
 Curtis Mayfield, Gary Thompson - guitars

References

Mavis Staples albums
Curtis Mayfield soundtracks
Collaborative albums
1977 soundtrack albums
Albums produced by Curtis Mayfield
Curtom Records albums
Crime film soundtracks
Comedy film soundtracks